The Populist Caucus was a caucus within the United States House of Representatives. The caucus was created on February 11, 2009, by Democrat Bruce Braley of Iowa. The caucus included 25 members of the House, all of which are from the Democratic Party. The fifteen members of this caucus are also members of the Congressional Progressive Caucus. As of 2014 the caucus is effectively defunct.

Founding principles

The founding principles of the caucus are the following:

 Fighting for working families and the middle class through the establishment of an equitable tax structure, fair wages, proper benefits, a level playing field at the negotiating table, and secure, solvent retirement plans.
 Providing affordable, accessible, quality health care to all Americans.
 Ensuring accessible, quality primary education for all American children, and affordable college education for all who want it.
 Protecting consumers, so that Americans can once again have faith in the safety and effectiveness of the products they purchase.
 Defending American competitiveness by fighting for fair trade principles.
 Creating and retaining good-paying jobs in America.

Past members

Bruce Braley (D-IA) – Chair
Peter DeFazio (D-OR) – Vice-Chair
Rosa DeLauro (D-CT) – Vice-Chair
Donna Edwards (D-MD) – Vice-Chair
Keith Ellison (D-MN)   
Steve Cohen (D-TN)
Joe Courtney (D-CT)
Lloyd Doggett (D-TX)
John Garamendi (D-CA)
Hank Johnson (D-GA)
Marcy Kaptur (D-OH)
Dan Lipinski (D-IL)
David Loebsack (D-IA)
Ben Ray Lujan (D-NM)
Michael Michaud (D-ME)
Linda Sánchez (D-CA)
Jan Schakowsky (D-IL)
Brad Sherman (D-CA)
Louise Slaughter (D-NY)
Jackie Speier (D-CA)
Paul Tonko (D-NY)   
Henry Waxman (D-CA)
Peter Welch (D-VT)
John Yarmuth (D-KY)

References

 Report from the Iowa Independent
 22 Democratic Members of Congress join to form Populist Caucus
 Member list

Democratic Party (United States)
Left-wing populism in the United States
Factions in the Democratic Party (United States)